The history of the Jews in Békés, a county in Hungary, has lasted more than two centuries.

History 
The history of the Jews in Békés County began the first half of the 1700s. Jews have lived in Békés County, since the 18th century. In 1768, there were only 3 Jews in the village of Vari (Gyulavari). From the end of the 18th century, the first Jewish communities were founded in Vari, Dévaványa and Békésszentandrás.

In 1836, there were 542 Jews in Békés County, but by 1870 there were 6255. From the 1850s to the First World War, a large infrastructure was built including Jewish cemeteries, synagogues, prayer-houses, mikvehs, schools and Chevra Kadishas (Békéscsaba, Gyula, Orosháza, Szeghalom, Békés, Szarvas, Battonya and Sarkad)

The Holocaust 

From 1941, forced labour was imposed on the Jews, and all of the Jews of Békés County went either to the ghettos and/or to the concentration camps of Békéscsaba and Szolnok. Others were deported on transports to Auschwitz-Birkenau and Strasshof.

Around 5,000 Békés County Jews were murdered in the Holocaust. Of the 2,000 survivors, very few returned to the area and now the Békés County Jewish community is very small and is concentrated in Békéscsaba where a new synagogue has been built.

Holocaust memorial days 
In Békéscsaba, Orosháza, Gyula, Szarvas, Tótkomlós and Doboz - every year, in summer.

Memorials 
 Synagogues (Békéscsaba, Gyula, Békés, Orosháza, Füzesgyarmat)
 Prayerhouses (Medgyesegyháza)
 School-buildings (Békéscsaba, Orosháza, Dévaványa)
 Jewish cemeteries (Körösnagyharsány, Dévaványa)

References

External links 
 Istvan Balogh's homepage about the jews of Békés county, Hungary
 Szarvas Jewish Camp
 The original address of the page in Hungarian: ":hu:Békés megyei zsidók"

Jews
Bekes